AN Mahfuza Khatun (known as Baby Maudud; 23 June 1948 – 25 July 2014) was a Bangladeshi journalist, politician, and writer. She was a member of parliament of Bangladesh Jatiya Sangsad.

Biography
Maudud was born on 23 June 1948 in Kolkata, India to Hedayet-un-Nisa and Abdul Maudud, a justice. She was the third among six brothers and three sisters.

Maudud started working as a journalist in 1967, while a student at the University of Dhaka. Maudud took part in the 1969 mass upsurge and was engaged in political activities with Begum Sufia Kamal in 1971. She graduated with a degree in Bangla in 1971.

She married advocate Md Hasan Ali in 1972. Together they had two sons, Rabiul Hasan Avi and Shafiul Hassan Dipto. Her husband died in 1984.

During her career as a journalist, she worked for The Daily Ittefaq, the BBC, The Sangbad,  and Weekly Bichitra. She was the chief news editor of the state-run news agency, Bangladesh Sangbad Sangstha (BSS). She served as the social affairs editor at bdnews24.com.

When, in 2011, the 15th amendment to the Bangladesh Constitution increased the number of seats in the Bangladesh Parliament by five additional seats reserved for women, Madud was one of the five women elected.

Maudud won Anannya Bishesh Shommanona in 2012. For her contributions to the advancement of women, she was posthumously awarded the Begum Rokeya Padak in 2017.

Works
 Mone Mone
 Sheikh Mujiber Chhotobela
 Pabitro Rokeya Path
 Gonotanter Manoshkonna Sheikh Hasina
 Muktijoddhah Manik
 Bangabandhu Sheikh Mujib O Tar Paribar

References

1948 births
2014 deaths
Bangladeshi women journalists
Awami League politicians
University of Dhaka alumni
Burials at Banani Graveyard
Women members of the Jatiya Sangsad
21st-century Bangladeshi women politicians